Kosut is a village in Iran.

Kosut may also refer to:
A variant of Kossuth (surname)
Emircan Koşut, Turkish basketballer